Mount Wickham is a mountain on East Falkland, Falkland Islands. It is the chief summit of the Wickham Heights.  It stands 1,984 ft, 605 m.

References

Wickham Heights